Ukiah High School (also referred to as UHS or "Ukiahi") is the oldest public high school in Ukiah, California, the seat of Mendocino County. Established in 1893, it is the largest school by enrollment and only four-year comprehensive high school in the Ukiah Unified School District. It serves all students in the ninth through twelfth grades from the incorporated city of Ukiah plus the four smaller, adjacent communities of Calpella, Hopland, Redwood Valley and Talmage and other rural residents of southeastern Mendocino County.

Campus 

Awards and recognition 

The school was recognized as a California Distinguished School in 1988 and again in 2001.

Notable alumni 
 Kelvin Chapman, MLB second baseman (New York Mets 1979-85)
 Shiloh Fernandez, actor
 Holly Near, actress and songwriter
 Harold L. "Hal" Perry ('52), college basketball player for the USF Dons, 1952-56 (1955 & 1956 NCAA Men's Division I National Champions)
 Rick Warren, minister and author
 Members of the band AFI (A Fire Inside):
 Adam Carson
 Davey Havok
 Jade Puget

References

External links 
 
 

High schools in Mendocino County, California
Public high schools in California
Ukiah, California
1893 establishments in California